To Charles Fort, With Love is a short story collection by fantasist Caitlin R. Kiernan, published by Subterranean Press in 2005. As the author explains in the preface, many of these stories were inspired by the writings of Charles Fort (1874-1932), and many of them have a Lovecraftian flavor. Two of the stories have received the International Horror Guild Award: "Onion" (Best Short Fiction, 2001) and "La Peau Verte" (Best Mid-Length Fiction, 2005). Also, "La Peau Verte" and the collection as a whole were both nominated for the World Fantasy Award (2005). As with Kiernan's earlier short-story collections, the book is illustrated by Canadian artist Richard A. Kirk, and the cover art is provided by Ryan Obermeyer. An afterword, "A Certain Inexplicability," was provided by Ramsey Campbell.

Contents
Preface - "Looking for Innsmouth"
"Valentia"
"Spindleshanks (New Orleans, 1956)"
"So Runs the World Away"
"Standing Water"
"La Mer des Rêves"
"The Road of Pins"
"Onion"
"Apokatastasis"
"La Peau Verte"
"The Dead and the Moonstruck"
The Dandridge Cycle:
"A Redress for Andromeda"
"Nor the Demons Down Under the Sea"
"Andromeda Among the Stones"
Afterword: "A Certain Inexplicability" (by Ramsey Campbell)

External links
  (hardback, 2005)
 Judging a Book by Its Cover: The Hell With Love, an article at Bookslut on To Charles Fort, With Love

2005 short story collections
Fantasy short story collections
Short story collections by Caitlín R. Kiernan